John Bowton (also John Bouton, John Boughton) (October 1636 – January 1707) was a founding settler of Norwalk, Connecticut. He served as a deputy of the General Assembly of the Colony of Connecticut from Norwalk in the sessions of October 1671, October 1673, May 1674, May 1675, October 1676, May and October 1677, May 1678, October 1679, May 1680, May 1681, May and October 1682. May 1683, and May and October 1685.

He was the son of John Bouton and Alice Kellogg Bouton.

He is listed on the Founders Stone bearing the names of the founding settlers of Norwalk in the East Norwalk Historical Cemetery.

References 

1636 births
1707 deaths
American Puritans
Burials in East Norwalk Historical Cemetery
Deputies of the Connecticut General Assembly (1662–1698)
Founding settlers of Norwalk, Connecticut
Politicians from Hartford, Connecticut